The Botola Pro, is a Moroccan professional league for men's association football clubs. At the top of the Moroccan football league system, it is the country's primary football competition. Contested by 16 clubs, it operates on a system of promotion and relegation with the Botola 2.

Seasons run from August to May, with teams playing 30 matches each (playing each team in the league twice, home and away) totaling 240 matches in the season. Most games are played in the afternoons of Saturdays and Sundays, the other games during weekday evenings. It is sponsored by Inwi and thus known as the Botola Pro Inwi. From 2015 to 2019, the league was called Botola Maroc Telecom for sponsorship reasons.

The competition formed as the FRMF on 20 February 1992 following the decision of clubs in the Botola Pro to break away from the UNAF, which had been founded in 1911, and take advantage of a lucrative television rights deal. This deal is worth 55 million MAD a year domestically as of 2015–16, with Arryadia securing the domestic rights to broadcast games respectively. The league generates 123 million MAD per year in domestic and international television rights.

The Moroccan top-flight has produced the second-highest number of CAF Champions League titles, with three Moroccan clubs having won seven African trophies in total. They also produced the highest number of CAF Confederation Cup titles, with five Moroccan clubs having won seven African confederation trophies.

The current champions are Wydad AC who won the title in 2021–22 season.

History 

The Moroccan Football Championship was launched in the Sultanate in 11 june 1915. Organised by the Moroccan football league. The new organisation under the Royal Moroccan Football Federation took place in january 1957, Wydad AC was crowned with the edition of the 1956/1957 season, which was its sixth title. In the following season, the Kawkab Marrakech club was crowned, and then the following two seasons were crowned by the youth star and KAC Kénitra.

The start of great rivalry (1960–1970) 
AS FAR dominated the championship for four consecutive seasons despite the competition being played by strong teams, namely Maghreb de Fès and Kawkab Marrakech, where the Askari Club was able to enter history as the first club to achieve four consecutive titles in the years (1961–1964). Then in the 1964–1965 season, Maghreb de Fès won its first title, then Wydad AC won the league title in the 1965–1966 season, which is the beginning of the competition between Raja CA and Wydad AC in the tournament, where the derby was repeated due to the public entering the stadium which ended with Raja winning 2–1; But when it was replayed, it ended in a 0–0 draw, and thus Wydad AC won the championship by one point over Raja CA.

New Champions (1971–1995) 
New teams were able to crown the championship title during this period, including RS Settat, Racing de Casablanca, Raja Beni Mellal, MC Oujda, SCC Mohammédia, and others that had previously been crowned as Wydad, who won the league for three consecutive seasons. Kenitra was able to obtain the championship in the 1973–1972 season in a dramatic way in a season known as the famous case of the Car Dial Fez, where it noticed the survival of Wydad from going down to the second national division due to the cancellation of the interview of Maghreb de Fès with Wydad AC in the last round due to a malfunction in the bus that was carrying the players of Maghreb Fez, which automated a loss for fez and Wydad got 4 points, KAC Kénitra won the league.

Maghreb de Fès was able to add two more titles to its treasury at this stage. KAC Kénitra managed to win two successive titles, while Olympique de Casablanca won their first title, and the competition was strong between Wydad AC and the AS FAR, where the Military Club won three titles, bringing the total of its titles to 10 to hang its first star, and then Wydad was able to win four titles, bringing its total titles to 15. While the Kawkab Marrakech club was satisfied with its second title only, while another new competitor appeared, Raja CA, which won its first title in the 1988–1987 season.

Raja's Glory (1995–2002) 
In the seven seasons between 1995 and 2002, Raja CA arose quickly making it one of the most supported club in Morocco, as it managed to obtain the championship for six consecutive seasons in a golden period during which a generation of excellent players appeared. This period coincided with the emergence of Raja Casablanca on the scene International in the African Champions League and Club World Cup. Appearing in 3 CAF Champions League Final winning 2 but losing the 2002 CAF Champions League Final and ending 7th in the 2000 FIFA Club World Championship.

New champions (2002–2011) 
Hassania Agadir managed to win the championship twice in a row, despite the competition from the two poles of the economic capital. After that, the tournament became more exciting between the two poles of Casablanca, Wydad and ASFAR as the tournament was not decided until the last two rounds or the last round. FAR and Wydad Casablanca won two titles, while Olympique Khouribga won its first title in its history. While Raja continued the race to try to catch up with Wydad and the Army, as it won three titles, bringing its total to ten titles, to be the third team to suspend the ten titles.

The start of Botola Pro (2011–present) 
In light of the league's strength, it was necessary for the Moroccan League to move Moroccan football from the abyss to professionalism, so the first professional season was 2011–12 which was crowned by the Maghreb Tetouan club for the first time in its history. Raja Casablanca managed to win the title in the 2012–13 season, then followed by Maghreb Tetouan in the 2013–14 Botola. In the 2014–15 season, Wydad Casablanca returned after 5 years again to win the 18th title in its history. FUS Rabat also won the 2015–16 season title for the first time in its history, while Wydad Casablanca won the 2016–17 Botola League title for the 19th time in its history. In 2017–18, IR Tanger managed to win their 1st league title in its history. On 4 October 2020, the FRMF introduced the Virtual Offside Line in Botola. Botola has been ranked in the top 40 world's strongest national league of the decade by International Federation of Football History & Statistics. On 27 December 2022, The President of the National League stated that the winter transfer market will depend on the financial status of the clubs and to resolve all standing disputes related to player contracts, as well as the technical and medical staff of the clubs. Since 2018, Botola has been ranked top 3 strongest African leagues by IFFHS.

Competition format 
There are 16 clubs in the Botola. During the course of a season (from August to May) each club plays the others twice (a double round-robin system), once at their home stadium and once at that of their opponents', for 30 games. Teams receive three points for a win and one point for a draw. No points are awarded for a loss. Teams are ranked by total points, then goal difference, and then goals scored. If still equal, teams are deemed to occupy the same position. If there is a tie for the championship, for relegation, or for qualification to other competitions, a play-off match at a neutral venue decides rank.

Champion and runner-up participate in the African Champions League. The third-place team and Coupe du Trône winner qualify to participate in the African Confederation Cup.

Promotion and relegation
A system of promotion and relegation exists between the Botola and the Botola 2. The two lowest placed teams in the Botola are relegated to the Botola 2, and the top two teams from the Botola 2 promoted to the Botola.

Sponsorship 
Since 2020, inwi has been the official sponsor of the Botola for a 15 million dirham per year contract.

Broadcasting rights 
In September 2007, the SNRT Group (Al Aoula, 2M TV and Arryadia) paid 225 million dirhams for the rights to broadcast the following three seasons of the Botola.

Throughout the week, every game played in the Botola is broadcast live by at least one TV channel.

BeIN Sports network also broadcasts a few matches every week.

Qualification for African competitions

Association ranking for 2022–23 CAF competitions
Association ranking for 2022–23 CAF Champions League and 2022–23 CAF Confederation Cup will be based on results from each CAF tournament (Champions League and Confederation Cup) from 2018 to 2021–22.

Legend
 CL: CAF Champions League
 CC: CAF Confederation Cup

Stadiums

Current stadiums

Other stadiums

List of champions

Botola clubs in Africa 
The Botola is currently the first in the CAF 5-Year Ranking of African leagues based on their performances in African competitions over a five-year period, ahead of Egypt's Egyptian Premier League and Tunisia's Tunisian Ligue Professionnelle 1.

Raja CA and Wydad AC have been in the top ten most successful clubs in African football in terms of total African trophies. These two clubs, along with AS FAR and Maghreb de Fès, are four of the most successful teams in African competition history. Hassania Agadir, Olympique Club de Khouribga, Difaâ Hassani El Jadidi and Fath Union Sport are the joint fourth-most participating Moroccan team in the Champions League with Maghreb de Fès — after Raja Casablanca, Wydad Casablanca and ASFAR Rabat. FAR Rabat is the first Moroccan club to win an international cup after defeating AS Bilima in the 1985 African Cup of Champions Clubs Finals.

Moroccan Clubs are the most titled in the CAF Confederation Cup with 7 titles and the second most titled Clubs in the CAF Champions League and CAF Super Cup. FAR Rabat became the first Moroccan club to play back-to-back finals in the African Confederation Cup winning the 2005 Confederation Cup and losing the 2006 Confederation Cup.

Performances

Performance by club

By city

Performance comparison since 2011
Performance comparison of top teams since 2011.

All-time Botola Pro table (since 2011)
The all-time Botola Pro table is an overall record of all match results, points, and goals of every team that has played in Botola Pro since its new format inception in 2011. The table is accurate as of the end of the 2021–22 season. Teams in bold are part of the 2022–23 Botola season.

Player records

Most goals

The table shows the Botola Pro top scorers since its new format inception in 2011. The table is accurate as of the end of the 2021–22 season.

Boldface indicates a player still active in Botola Pro1. Italics indicates a player still active outside Botola Pro1.

The historical top scorer of the competition is Ahmed Faras
with 231 goals

See also 
 Sport in Morocco
Moroccan football league (1916 – 1955)

Notes

References

External links

League at FIFA.com
Competition history at the RSSSF
Botola 1 – Hailoosport.com 
Botola 1 – Hailoosport.com

 
1
Morocco